The Continental Celtic languages are the now-extinct group of the Celtic languages that were spoken on the continent of Europe and in central Anatolia, as distinguished from the Insular Celtic languages of the British Isles and Brittany. Continental Celtic is a geographic, rather than linguistic, grouping of the ancient Celtic languages.

These languages were spoken by the people known to Roman and Greek writers as the Keltoi, Celtae, Galli, and Galatae. They were spoken in an area arcing from the northern half of Iberia in the west to north of Belgium, and east to the Carpathian basin and the Balkans as Noric, and in inner Anatolia (modern day Turkey) as Galatian.

Even though Breton has been spoken in Continental Europe since at least the 6th century AD, it is not considered one of the Continental Celtic languages, as it is a Brittonic language, like Cornish and Welsh. A Gaulish substratum in Breton has been suggested, but that is debated.

Attested languages 
It is likely that Celts spoke dozens of different languages and dialects across Europe in pre-Roman times, but only a small number are attested:
 Lepontic (6th to 4th century BC) was spoken on the southern side of the Alps. It is evidenced in a number of inscriptions as well as place names.
 Gaulish (3rd century BC to 5th (?) century AD) was the main language spoken in greater Gaul. This is often considered to be divided into two dialects, Cisalpine (spoken in what is now Italy) and Transalpine (spoken in what is now France). It is evidenced in a number of inscriptions as well as place names and tribal names in writings of classical authors. It may have been a substratum to Breton (see below).
 Galatian, which was spoken in the region of Ankara of what is now central Turkey. Classical writers say that the language is similar to that of Gaul. There is also evidence of invasion and settlement of the Ankara area by Celts from Europe.
 Noric, which is the name given sometimes to the Celtic spoken in Central and Eastern Europe. It was spoken in Austria and Slovenia; only two fragmentary texts are preserved.
 Celtiberian or Northeastern Hispano-Celtic (3rd to 1st century BC) is the name given to the language in northeast Iberia, between the headwaters of the Douro, Tagus, Júcar and Turía rivers and the Ebro river. It is attested in some 200 inscriptions as well as place names. It is distinct from Iberian. 
 Gallaecian also called Gallaic or Northwestern Hispano-Celtic, attested in a set (corpus) of Latin inscriptions containing isolated words and sentences that are unmistakably Celtic. It was spoken in the northwest of the Iberian Peninsula comprising today's Spanish regions of Galicia, western Asturias and western Castile and León, and the Norte Region in northern Portugal.

Use of term 
The modern term Continental Celtic is used in contrast to Insular Celtic. While many researchers agree that Insular Celtic is a distinct branch of Celtic (Cowgill 1975; McCone 1991, 1992; Schrijver 1995) that has undergone common linguistic innovations, there is no evidence that the Continental Celtic languages can be similarly grouped. Instead, the group called Continental Celtic is paraphyletic, and the term refers simply to non-Insular Celtic languages. Since little material has been preserved in any of the Continental Celtic languages, historical linguistic analysis based on the comparative method is difficult to perform. However, other researchers see the Brittonic languages and Gaulish as forming part of a subgroup of the Celtic languages that is known as P-Celtic. Continental languages are P-Celtic except for Celtiberian, which is Q-Celtic. They have had a definite influence on all of the Romance languages.

See also 
 Italo-Celtic

References

Bibliography 
 
 
 
 
 
 
 
 

 
Extinct Celtic languages